Lathropus pubescens is a species of lined flat bark beetles in the family Laemophloeidae. It is found in North America.

References

 Casey, Thos. L. (1884). "Revision of the Cucujidae of America North of Mexico". Transactions of the American Entomological Society, vol. 11, 69–112.
 Thomas, Michael C. (1993). "The Flat Bark Beetles of Florida (Coleoptera: Silvanidae, Passandridae, Laemophloeidae)". Arthropods of Florida and Neighboring Land Areas, vol. 15, vii + 93.

Further reading

 Arnett, R.H. Jr., M. C. Thomas, P. E. Skelley and J. H. Frank. (eds.). (2002). American Beetles, Volume II: Polyphaga: Scarabaeoidea through Curculionoidea. CRC Press LLC, Boca Raton, FL.
 Arnett, Ross H. (2000). American Insects: A Handbook of the Insects of America North of Mexico. CRC Press.
 Richard E. White. (1983). Peterson Field Guides: Beetles. Houghton Mifflin Company.

Laemophloeidae